Alan Roger Dickins was Arundel Herald of Arms Extraordinary from 1998 to 2016.

He was educated at Epsom College, Surrey and Emmanuel College, Cambridge, where he graduated with a law degree in 1968. He qualified in 1972 as a solicitor of the Supreme Court of England and Wales, but a keen interest in genealogy and heraldry eventually led to his engagement in 1986 as a research assistant at the College of Arms. From 1995 he worked closely with Garter Principal King of Arms, Peter Gwynn-Jones while at the same time pursuing a fully independent legal career. He has made a special study of the relationship between intellectual property law and the present-day law of arms. He was appointed Arundel Herald of Arms Extraordinary in 1998, succeeding Rodney Dennys (d.1993), and demitted that office in 2016. He was married from 1983 to 2015 and has two sons. His other interests include music and fell-walking.

Publications
Alan R Dickins (ed.). The Visitation of Hertfordshire 1669. (Harleian Society, London: 2019).

Arms

References

Year of birth missing (living people)
Living people
English officers of arms
English genealogists